Bartolo as a given name may refer to:

Bartholomew the Apostle (St. Bartholomew), known as San Bartolo in Spanish-speaking countries
Bartolo Colón (born 1973), Dominican baseball pitcher
Bartolo di Fredi (1330-1410), Sienese School
Bl. Bartolo Longo (1841–1926), former Satanist priest who became a lay Dominican
Bartolo Musil, Austrian musician
Bartolo Portuondo, Cuban baseball player

See also
Bartolo (surname)
Bartolo Nardini, Italian grappa company

Spanish masculine given names